Glow is the second solo album by Al Jarreau, released in 1976.

Track listing

Personnel 
 Al Jarreau – vocals, effects (5)
 Tom Canning – electric piano (1-4, 6-9)
 Larry Nash – synthesizers (1, 7), ARP String Ensemble (1)
 Joe Sample – acoustic piano (2, 6), organ (4)
 Larry Carlton – guitars (1-4, 6-9)
 Wilton Felder – bass (1, 3, 4)
 Willie Weeks – bass (2, 6, 7, 9)
 Paul Stallworth – bass (8)
 Joe Correro – drums (1-4, 6-9)
 Steve Forman – percussion (1, 3), tambourine (4)
 Ralph MacDonald – percussion (6-9)
 Nick DeCaro – vocal arrangements (1)
 Dale Oehler – string and synthesizer arrangements, conductor

Production 
 Tommy LiPuma – producer 
 Al Schmitt – producer, engineer, mixing  
 Don Henderson – assistant engineer 
 Linda Tyler – assistant engineer 
 Doug Sax – mastering 
 The Mastering Lab (Hollywood, California) – mastering location 
 Noel Newbolt – production assistant 
 Calbalka Studio – art direction, design 
 Moshe Brahka – photography 
 Susan Jarreau – photography
 Patrick Rains – management

Charts
Glow peaked at #132 and #30 on the Billboard 200 on the Soul LP charts respectively.

The only single to be released and make the charts was "Rainbow in Your Eyes" reaching number 92 on the R&B charts.

Album

Charting singles

Production
 Producers – Tommy LiPuma and Al Schmitt
 Production Assistant – Noel Newbolt
 Engineer – Al Schmitt
 Assistant Engineers – Don Henderson and Linda Tyler 
 Recorded at Capitol Studios and Sound Labs (Hollywood, CA).
 Mixed at Capitol Studios.
 Mastered by Doug Sax at The Mastering Lab (Hollywood, CA).
 Design – John Calbaka
 Photography – Moshe Brakha and Susan Jarreau
 Management – Patrick Rains

References

1976 albums
Al Jarreau albums
Albums produced by Tommy LiPuma
Reprise Records albums
Albums recorded at Capitol Studios